Makaya Nsilulu (born 5 May 1977) is a retired footballer from DR Congo.

Nsilulu was a member of the DR Congo squad for the 2000 Africa Cup of Nations.

External links

1977 births
Living people
Democratic Republic of the Congo footballers
Democratic Republic of the Congo expatriate footballers
Democratic Republic of the Congo international footballers
2000 African Cup of Nations players
C.D. Primeiro de Agosto players
Espérance Sportive de Tunis players
ES Zarzis players
AS Djerba players
Neuchâtel Xamax FCS players
Al-Ahli SC (Tripoli) players
Expatriate footballers in Angola
Expatriate footballers in Tunisia
Expatriate footballers in Switzerland
Expatriate footballers in Libya
Democratic Republic of the Congo expatriate sportspeople in Switzerland
Association football midfielders
Libyan Premier League players
21st-century Democratic Republic of the Congo people